= Leningrad Province =

Leningrad Province may refer to:

- Leningrad Oblast, a federal subject of Russia
- Leningrad Governorate, an administrative division of the Soviet Union
